Washington Academy may refer to:

Washington Academy (Maine), a preparatory high school in East Machias, Maine, United States
Washington Academy, Sunderland, a secondary school in the City of Sunderland, Tyne and Wear, England

See also
Washington College Academy
Washington (disambiguation)